Ronda de Dalt (common name) or B-20 motorway is a ring road or beltway within Barcelona and other parts of its metropolitan area, running from l'Hospitalet de Llobregat, to Nus de la Trinitat in the Sant Andreu district of Barcelona. It was completed in 1992 on the occasion of the 1992 Summer Olympics. Parts of the road are completely underground whereas some other look pretty much like other thoroughfares in the city.

Other ring roads and rondes in Barcelona
Ronda del Mig
Ronda Litoral
Ronda del Guinardó

See also
List of beltways
Street names in Barcelona
Urban planning of Barcelona

References 
Bcn.es
Traffic surveillance

Roads in Barcelona
Ring roads in Spain
Transport in Barcelonès
Transport in Baix Llobregat